The Eau Claire Express is a collegiate summer baseball team playing in the Northwoods League. Their home games are played at Carson Park, in Eau Claire, Wisconsin.

After two straight losing seasons in 2005 and 2006, the Eau Claire Express achieved many firsts during the 2007 season. The team won nine of its final ten regular season games to finish 42-26 overall and claim the 2007 2nd Half South Division title, their first regular season division title in franchise history and qualified for the Northwoods League playoffs, another franchise first.

In the 2007, South Division Championship Series, they faced the 1st Half South Division Champion Green Bay Bullfrogs. They won the series 2-1, claiming the 2007 South Division Pennant, another first in franchise history. In the 2007 Northwoods League Championship Series, they faced the North Division Champion St. Cloud River Bats and were swept 2-0 by the eventual Northwoods League Champions.

The 2008 season ended with the Express missing the Northwoods League playoffs by 1.5 games. The Express finished the season one game below .500.

The Express had one of their best seasons in 2009. They had a great first half, winning the NWL South Division to qualify for the playoffs. However, injuries and summer school depleted the squad in the second half. Eau Claire was eliminated in two games by the La Crosse Loggers in the Northwoods League Divisional round.

In 2010, the Express won the first half of the season again with a 22-12 record.  Via www.perfectgame.org, the Express have been ranked as high as #3 in the nation for summer collegiate baseball. The team closed out the 2010 season winning both halves.  They followed this up by winning the NWL Championship and www.perfectgame.org ranked the Eau Claire Express the #1 summer collegiate team in the nation.

The Express moved to the North Division for 2014, to accommodate the new NWL teams in Kenosha, Wisconsin and Kalamazoo, Michigan.

The 2016, season saw the Express return to the Northwoods League postseason after winning the season's first half title. This was the first time the team had qualified for the playoffs since the 2010 season. Eau Claire opened the playoffs hosting the Mankato MoonDogs in the first round of the Divisional Playoffs at Carson Park. Despite having only a 1-7 record vs. Mankato in the regular season, Eau Claire was able to defeat the MoonDogs to advance. The next night the team traveled to St. Cloud, Minn. to face the second half champion Rox for a chance to play for the NWL Championship. After blowing a late lead, the Express were able to defeat the Rox in extra innings to win the North Division title. 	

Awaiting the Express in the NWL Championship Series was the Wisconsin Rapids Rafters, the owners of the league's best regular season record. Eau Claire led game one by a run with two outs in the ninth inning at Witter Field in Wisconsin Rapids, Wis. before giving up a walk-off, two-run home run to lose. The Express would go on to lose game two the following night at Carson Park to end a successful season and concede the Northwoods League title to the Rafters. The title was the first in franchise history for Wisconsin Rapids, in their first trip to the postseason in seven seasons of play.

Express Players to reach Major League Baseball
Jordan Zimmermann - Washington Nationals, Detroit Tigers, Milwaukee Brewers 
Kole Calhoun - Los Angeles Angels, Arizona Diamondbacks, Texas Rangers
Nevin Ashley - Milwaukee Brewers
Eddie Gamboa - Tampa Bay Rays
Brad Goldberg - Chicago White Sox
Dietrich Enns - Minnesota Twins, Tampa Bay Rays
Nathan Orf - Milwaukee Brewers, Oakland Athletics
Sam Haggerty - New York Mets, Seattle Mariners
Daulton Varsho - Arizona Diamondbacks 
Louis Head - Tampa Bay Rays, Miami Marlins
Griffin Jax - Minnesota Twins
Steven Wilson - San Diego Padres
Mickey McDonald - Oakland Athletics
Michael Papierski - San Francisco Giants
Mark Hallberg (Coach) - San Francisco Giants
Justin Viele (Coach) - San Francisco Giants

Express players drafted in the 2007 MLB Draft:

Jordan Zimmermann- RHP Washington Nationals
Thomas Eager- RHP St. Louis Cardinals
Evan Frey- OF  Arizona Diamondbacks
Ryan Tatusko- RHP Texas Rangers
Kraig Binick- OF Baltimore Orioles
Mark Hallberg- SS Arizona Diamondbacks
Russ Dixon- OF Houston Astros

Express players drafted in the 2008 MLB Draft:
Shane Dyer- RHP Tampa Bay Rays
Jake Jefferies- C Tampa Bay Rays
Tim Huber- LHP Kansas City Royals
Bryan Frew- OF Philadelphia Phillies
David Cales- RHP Chicago Cubs
Chris Odegaard- RHP Minnesota Twins
Ryan O'Sullivan- SS/RHP San Francisco Giants
Eddie Gamboa- RHP Baltimore Orioles

Express players drafted in the 2010 MLB Draft:
Kole Calhoun – OF/LA Angels
Devin Lohman – SS/Cincinnati Reds
Rafael Neda – C/Milwaukee Brewers
Cole Nelson – LHP/Detroit Tigers
Brooks Pinckard – RHP/OF/Chicago Cubs
Pete Gehle – LHP/Chicago White Sox
DeMarcus Tidwell – OF/Cleveland Indians
Tyler Bremer – RHP/Chicago Cubs
Ryan Kiel – LHP/Seattle Mariners
George Jensen – RHP/Tampa Bay Rays

Express players drafted in the 2012 MLB Draft:

Express players drafted in the 2013 MLB Draft:

References

External links
 Northwoods League website

Northwoods League teams
Sports in Eau Claire, Wisconsin
Amateur baseball teams in Wisconsin
Tourist attractions in Eau Claire County, Wisconsin